was a Japanese professional baseball player of American and Japanese mixed ancestry. He played professionally in both Japan and the United States. Irabu played for the Lotte Orions / Chiba Lotte Marines and Hanshin Tigers of Nippon Professional Baseball (NPB) and for the New York Yankees, Montreal Expos, and Texas Rangers of Major League Baseball (MLB).

Irabu debuted in NPB in 1988 and played for the Marines through the 1996 season. Desiring to play in MLB, the Marines sold Irabu to the San Diego Padres, with whom they had a working arrangement, despite Irabu's desire to play for the Yankees. When Irabu refused to play for San Diego, they traded him to the Yankees, and the aftermath of the deal led to the development of the posting system. Irabu was a member of the Yankees' World Series-winning teams in 1998 and 1999, becoming the first Japanese-born player to win a World Series.

Irabu pitched in the major leagues through 2002 and returned to Japan with the Tigers in 2003 and retired after the 2004 season. Irabu died by suicide in 2011.

Early life
Irabu was born on May 5, 1969, in Hirara (present: Miyakojima), Okinawa, Japan (then administered by the government of the United States). His father was a U.S. Air Force meteorologist named Steve Thompson, married to a woman in the United States at the time. Thompson, who had been redeployed to Vietnam before his son's birth, briefly visited young Hideki and his mother a year later, but they would not again meet until after Irabu reached the U.S. major leagues. Hideki's mother, Kazue, a native of Miyako, later married a restaurateur, Ichiro Irabu, from Osaka. Irabu raised Hideki as his son in Amagasaki, Hyōgo Prefecture.

Career

Lotte Orions / Chiba Lotte Marines
Irabu pitched for the Lotte Orions, who later became the Chiba Lotte Marines, of the Pacific League from 1988–1996. He was known as a high-speed pitcher and in 1993, he threw a  fastball against Kazuhiro Kiyohara of the Seibu Lions. This was the fastest clocked pitch in all of Japanese Professional Baseball (NPB) until 2005, when the record was broken by Marc Kroon of the Yokohama BayStars.

Irabu led the Pacific League in wins in 1994 (15) and in ERA in 1995 and 1996 (2.53 & 2.40, respectively). He also led the Pacific League in strikeouts in 1994 and 1995 (239 & 167, respectively).

New York Yankees
In 1997, the San Diego Padres purchased Irabu's contract from the Chiba Lotte Marines. The criticisms of this sale from other MLB teams, who wished to bid on Irabu, led to the creation of the posting system currently used by Japanese and MLB teams. Irabu, however, refused to sign with the Padres, saying he would only play with the Yankees. For the negotiating rights to Irabu, the Yankees offered the Padres a choice of one from a list of players including Brian Boehringer, David Weathers, Chris Cumberland, Andy Fox and Matt Luke. The Padres eventually included him as a player-to-be-named-later in a trade that involved Homer Bush and Irabu going to the New York Yankees in exchange for Rafael Medina, Rubén Rivera, and $3 million in cash. The Yankees signed Irabu to a $12.8 million, four-year contract, and after only eight minor league appearances, the Yankees put him in their rotation.

Irabu made his highly publicized debut on July 10, 1997, drawing almost twice as many fans that night as they averaged for weeknight games. He played with the Yankees from 1997 through 1999, winning two World Series rings (1998, 1999) despite only pitching in one postseason game and having no postseason decisions. George Steinbrenner publicly expressed disgust at his weight, at one point calling him a "fat pussy toad" after he failed to cover first base on a ground ball during a spring training game. Steinbrenner refused to let Irabu accompany the team to Los Angeles, but two days later, Steinbrenner apologized and allowed Irabu to join the team.

1998 was Irabu's best season in MLB, featuring career bests in games started (28), complete games (2), innings pitched (173), wins (13), and ERA (4.06). Despite his inconsistency, Irabu was twice named the American League's Pitcher of the Month: in May 1998 and July 1999.

Montreal Expos
After the 1999 season, he was traded to the Montreal Expos for Ted Lilly, Christian Parker, and Jake Westbrook. He started only 14 games for the Expos in 2000 and 2001, pitching  innings with a 6.69 ERA and only two wins against seven losses.

Texas Rangers
In 2002, he signed as a free agent to pitch for the Texas Rangers as a closer.

Hanshin Tigers
At the end of the 2002 season, Irabu moved back to Japan to pitch in the Hanshin Tigers' starting rotation for the 2003 season, helping the team win the Central League pennant for the first time since 1985.

Before the 2004 season, he pitched 2004 MLB Japan Opening Series exhibition games against the Tampa Bay Devil Rays.

Over the course of six MLB seasons, Irabu's career totals are 126 games, 514 innings, 34 wins, 35 losses, 16 saves, 405 strikeouts, and a 5.15 ERA. His Japanese totals for eleven seasons are 273 games, 1,286 innings, 72 wins, 69 losses, 11 saves, 1,282 strikeouts, and a 3.55 ERA.

In April 2009, Irabu had come out of retirement and made a contract with Long Beach Armada of the independent Golden Baseball League. He posted a 5–3 record in 10 starts, with an ERA of 3.58. In 65 innings, Irabu struck out 66 batters while walking just 19. In August, he announced his intention to return to the Japanese professional leagues, and began playing for the semi-professional Kōchi Fighting Dogs.

Later life
On August 20, 2008, Irabu was arrested for assaulting the manager of a bar in Umeda, Osaka. When the credit card he presented for payment was not returned after 15 minutes, Irabu became suspicious and questioned him. Irabu was the victim of card skimming, and Irabu was later dropped from the case.

Irabu was arrested for driving under the influence of alcohol on May 17, 2010, in Redondo Beach, California. The press release of his arrest stated he resided at the time in Rancho Palos Verdes.

Irabu was found dead in his home in Los Angeles on July 27, 2011. He was reported to have hanged himself. He left behind his wife and two children. Irabu's autopsy showed he was inebriated at the time of his death with both alcohol and Ativan in his system. He was reportedly despondent because his wife had taken their two daughters and left him.

References

External links

1969 births
2011 deaths
Chiba Lotte Marines players
Columbus Clippers players
Hanshin Tigers players
Japanese expatriate baseball players in Canada
Japanese expatriate baseball players in the United States
Japanese people of American descent
Jupiter Hammerheads players
Kōchi Fighting Dogs players
Long Beach Armada players
Lotte Orions players
Major League Baseball pitchers
Major League Baseball players from Japan
Montreal Expos players
New York Yankees players
Nippon Professional Baseball pitchers
Norwich Navigators players
Ottawa Lynx players
Sportspeople from Amagasaki
Baseball people from Hyōgo Prefecture
Baseball people from Okinawa Prefecture
Suicides by hanging in California
Tampa Yankees players
Texas Rangers players
2011 suicides